Mary Rebecca Whipple (born May 10, 1980, in Sacramento, California, United States) is an American coxswain. She competed at the 2012 Summer Olympics and at the 2008 Summer Olympics. She won a gold medal in women's eight at both competitions. She also competed at the 2004 Summer Olympics where she won a silver medal.

As a freshman at the University of Washington, Mary coxed the women's varsity four to a national title in 1999. She coxed the varsity eight to victory at the Henley Royal Regatta in 2000, taking home the first-ever Henley Prize, while also coxing them to a silver medal in the NCAA championships as part of a second-place finish in the team standings that year. In 2001 and 2002, Mary coxed the varsity eight to back-to-back NCAA championships, and the Huskies also took home the team title in 2001.

Mary has an identical twin sister Sarah Jeanine Whipple. Sarah was an assistant coach for Women's Crew at the University of California at Berkeley and is now the Varsity Women's Head Coach at Capital Crew in Sacramento, California and has led the team to several US Rowing Regional and National Championship regattas.

See also
 Kate Johnson
 Erin Cafaro
 Anna (Mickelson) Cummins
 Caryn Davies
 Susan Francia
 Anna Goodale
 Caroline Lind
 Elle Logan
 Lindsay Shoop

References

External links
 Official website
 

Living people
American female rowers
Olympic gold medalists for the United States in rowing
Olympic silver medalists for the United States in rowing
Rowers at the 2004 Summer Olympics
Rowers at the 2008 Summer Olympics
Rowers at the 2012 Summer Olympics
1980 births
Medalists at the 2004 Summer Olympics
Medalists at the 2008 Summer Olympics
Medalists at the 2012 Summer Olympics
Coxswains (rowing)
World Rowing Championships medalists for the United States
Sportspeople from Sacramento, California